Hiram Gardner (1800 Dutchess County, New York - March 13, 1874 Lockport, Niagara County, New York) was an American lawyer and politician from New York.

Life
He was admitted to the bar and commenced practice in Lockport in 1822.
 
He was a member from Niagara County of the New York State Assembly and a presidential elector in 1836. He was the Secretary of the New York Electoral College, and cast his vote for Martin Van Buren like all the New York electors.

He was a delegate to the New York State Constitutional Convention of 1846.

He was First Judge and Surrogate of the Niagara County Court from July 1847 to December 1851.

He was a Canal Commissioner from 1859 to 1861, elected on the Republican ticket.

Sources
The New York Civil List compiled by Franklin Benjamin Hough, Stephen C. Hutchins and Edgar Albert Werner (1867; pages 389 and 406)
The New York Civil List compiled by Franklin Benjamin Hough (pages 42, 59, 218, 275, 329 and 362; Weed, Parsons and Co., 1858)

1800 births
1874 deaths
Politicians from Lockport, New York
Erie Canal Commissioners
1836 United States presidential electors
People from Dutchess County, New York
New York (state) state court judges
New York (state) Republicans
New York (state) Democrats
19th-century American judges